Hubert Schonger (1897–1978) was a German film director, producer and screenwriter. He began his career working on documentaries, but in the late 1930s switched to producing animated films.

Selected filmography

Producer
 Mountain Crystal (1949)
 Rübezahl (1957)
 Hunting Party (1959)

References

Bibliography
 Giesen, Rolf & Storm, J.P. Animation Under the Swastika: A History of Trickfilm in Nazi Germany, 1933-1945. McFarland, 2012.

External links

1897 births
1978 deaths
Film people from Bavaria
People from Dillingen (district)